Aspire may refer to:

Architecture
 Aspire Parramatta, a proposed skyscraper in New South Wales, Australia
 Aspire Tower, a skyscraper in Doha, Qatar

Arts, entertainment, and media
 Aspire (sculpture), a 2008 sculpture at the University of Nottingham, England
 Aspire (TV network), a United States television network owned by Magic Johnson and distributed by Comcast Corporation
 Aspire TV, an Australian television network
 "Aspire", a song by Northlane from their album Singularity

Automobiles
 Ford Aspire, a nameplate used on two different subcompact cars
 Ford Festiva, sold in North America as the Ford Aspire
 Ford Figo, sedan variant called Ford Figo Aspire in India
 Honda City, a Japanese subcompact sedan, sold in Pakistan as Honda City Aspire
 Mitsubishi Aspire, a Japanese mid-size sports sedan

Other uses
 Aspire (political party), an English minor political party
 Aspire Academy, a sports academy in Qatar
 Acer Aspire, a series of computers
 USS Aspire, transferred to the Soviet Union as Soviet minesweeper T-119

See also
 
 Aspiration (disambiguation)